Game Changer is the seventh studio album by American R&B singer Johnny Gill, released on December 9, 2014, by Gill's own label J Skillz Entertainment in conjunction with Caroline Records. Its release was preceded by the lead single "Behind Closed Doors." Game Changer debuted at number 56 on the US Billboard 200 and number 6 on the Billboard R&B chart.

Critical reception
The album has received positive reviews from critics. Andy Kellman of AllMusic rated the album three-and-a-half stars out of five and stated that the album is better than Gill's previous album, Still Winning. Melody Charles of SoulTracks praised the album, stating that Gill "[keeps his] skills on-deck" and that he is "a contender worth rooting for".

Track listing

Charts

Weekly charts

Year-end charts

References

External links
 
 

2014 albums
Caroline Records albums
Johnny Gill albums